Shashank Udapurkar is an Indian filmmaker, writer and actor. from Achalpur, Amravati, the state of Maharashtra, India.

Filmography

References

External links
 
 

Indian film directors
Living people
1975 births